The 1995–96 Memphis Tigers men's basketball team represented Memphis State University as a member of the Great Midwest Conference during the 1995–96 NCAA Division I men's basketball season. The Tigers were led by head coach Larry Finch and played their home games at the Pyramid Arena in Memphis, Tennessee.

The Tigers tied for the regular season conference title, but lost in the semifinals of the conference tournament. Despite the loss, Memphis received an at-large bid to the 1996 NCAA tournament as No. 5 seed in the West region. The Tigers were upset by No. 12 seed Drexel in the opening round. The team finished with a 22–8 record (11–3 Conference USA).

Roster

Schedule and results

|-
!colspan=9 style= | Regular season

|-
!colspan=9 style= | Conference USA Tournament

|-
!colspan=9 style= | NCAA Tournament

Rankings

References

Memphis Tigers men's basketball seasons
Memphis
Memphis
1995 in sports in Tennessee
1996 in sports in Tennessee